Walton is a suburb of Chesterfield, in the Chesterfield district, in the county of Derbyshire, England. Walton extends into the neighbouring North East Derbyshire district, with a small portion centred around the Acorn Ridge road and St. John's church within the Holymoorside and Walton civil parish. The population of the appropriate Chesterfield ward taken at the 2011 Census was 2,489.

Among its attractions are a few shops, a golf course, and a pub called The Blue Stoops on Matlock Road (A632). The River Hipper runs by Walton and feeds Walton Dam. There are two Christian churches in Walton: St. John's (Anglican) and Walton Evangelical Church. In 2006, the rebuilt St. John's was opened and is able to accommodate a larger congregation than the previous building. It is situated on the edge of the countryside, while Walton Evangelical is situated in the heart of the suburb.

Sport 
The Ashover Barbarians Cricket Club plays matches at the Robinsons Sports Ground cricket facility by Walton Dam.

See also
Listed buildings in Holymoorside and Walton

References

Populated places in Derbyshire
Chesterfield, Derbyshire